A partisan is a member of an irregular military force formed to oppose control of an area by a foreign power or by an army of occupation by some kind of insurgent activity. 

The term can apply to the field element of resistance movements. The most common use in present parlance in several languages refers to occupation resistance fighters during World War II, especially under the Yugoslav partisan leader Josip Broz Tito.

History before 1939 

The initial concept of partisan warfare involved the use of  troops raised from the local population in a war zone (or in some cases regular forces) who would operate behind enemy  lines to disrupt communications, seize posts or villages as forward-operating bases, ambush convoys, impose war taxes or contributions, raid logistical stockpiles, and compel enemy forces to disperse and protect their base of operations.

George Satterfield has analysed the "partisan warfare" in the Netherlands campaigns of 1673-1678 during the Franco-Dutch War of 1672-1678.
Some of the practices of ninjas in feudal Japan resembled irregular partisan warfare.

 De Jeney, a Hungarian military officer who served in the Prussian Army as  captain of military engineers during the Seven Years' War of 1756–1763, produced one of the first manuals of partisan  tactics in the 18th century: The Partisan, or the Art of Making War in Detachment... (English translation published in London in 1760.) Johann von Ewald described techniques of partisan warfare in detail in his Abhandlung über den kleinen Krieg ("Treatise on little war", Cramer: Cassel, 1785).

The concept of partisan warfare would later form the basis of the "Partisan Rangers" of the American Civil War of 1861-1865. In that war, Confederate States Army Partisan leaders, such as John S. Mosby, Jesse James, William Quantrill, or Bloody Bill Anderson, operated along the lines described by von Ewald (and later by both  Jomini (1779-1869) and  Clausewitz (1780-1831)). In essence, 19th-century American partisans were closer to commando or  ranger forces raised during World War II than to the partisan forces which would operate in Nazi-occupied Europe. Mosby-style fighters would have been legally considered uniformed members of their state's armed forces.

Partisans in the mid-19th century were substantially different from raiding cavalry, or from unorganized/semi-organized  guerrilla forces.

Russian partisans played a crucial part in the downfall of Napoleon. Their fierce resistance and persistent inroads helped compel the French emperor to retreat from Russia after invading in 1812 - note the activities of Denis Davydov. The Boers also deployed the concept of partisan warfare with their  kommandos during the Second Boer War of 1899-1902.

 Imperial Russia also made use of partisans in World War I, for example Stanisław Bułak-Bałachowicz.

By region

Italian

On 28 October 1922, Benito Mussolini and his fascist paramilitary troops, the Blackshirts, marched on Rome, seizing power, and the following day Mussolini became Duce (Prime Minister) of Italy. He thenceforth established a dictatorship centred around his fascist doctrine, and in 1936 Mussolini formed the Axis powers with Nazi Germany.

In July 1943, fascist Italy crumbled; Mussolini was turned in by the monarchy and placed under arrest by his government. Soon after, the nation fell into civil war. The Italian resistance movement, alongside the Italian Co-Belligerent Army, fought the Fascists and Italian Social Republic as well as Nazi forces who had begun to occupy Italy around the time of the armistice of Cassibile

One of the most important episodes of resistance by Italian armed forces after the armistice was the battle of Piombino, Tuscany. On 10 September 1943, during Operation Achse, a small German flotilla, commanded by Kapitänleutnant Karl-Wolf Albrand, tried to enter the harbour of Piombino but was denied access by the port authorities.

Eventually, after a drawn-out period of combat, the Italian partisans achieved victory. This was assisted by the fall of the Third Reich, which effectively nullified the attacks from German occupation, the ensuing uprising in April 1945 which pushed out all remaining German forces, the fall of Genoa and Milan on the 26 April, that of Turin two days after. That same day, Mussolini was captured and executed by Italian partisan Walter Audisio.

Polish

The order to organize partisan groups was issued by Marshal of Poland Rydz-Smigly on 16 September 1939. The first sabotage groups were created in Warsaw on 18 September 1939. Each battalion was to choose 3 soldiers who were to sabotage enemy's war effort behind the front lines. The sabotage groups were organized before Rydz-Smigly's order was received.

Independently, the Separated Unit of the Polish Army created in late 1939 in Poland is often recognized as he first partisan unit of World War II.

The situation amongst the Polish partisans and the situation of the Polish partisans were both complicated. The founding organizations that lead to the creation of the Home Army or Armia Krajowa, also known as AK, were themselves organized in 1939. Home Army was the largest Polish partisan organization; moreover, organizations such as peasant Bataliony Chlopskie, created primarily for self—defence against the Nazi German abuse, or the armed wing of the Polish Socialist Party and most of the nationalist National Armed Forces did subordinate themselves, before the end of the World War II, to the very Home Army. The communist Gwardia Ludowa remained indifferent and even hostile towards the Home Army, and of two Jewish organizations, the Jewish Military Union did cooperate with the Home Army, when the leftist and pro-Soviet Jewish Combat Organization did not.

Both Jewish combat organizations staged the Ghetto uprising in 1943. Armia Krajowa staged Warsaw Uprising in 1944, amongst other activities. Bataliony Chlopskie fought mainly in Zamosc Uprising.

The Polish partisans faced many enemies. The main enemies were the Nazi Germans, Ukrainian nationalists, Lithuanian Nazi collaborators, and even the Soviets. In spite of the ideological enmity, the Home Army did launch a massive sabotage campaign after the Germans began Operation Barbarossa. Amongst other acts of sabotage, the Polish partisans damaged nearly 7,000 locomotives, over 19,000 railway cars, over 4,000 German military vehicles and built-in faults into 92,000 artillery projectiles as well as 4710 built-in faults into aircraft engines, just to mention a few and just in between 1941 and 1944.

In Ukraine and southeastern Poland, the Poles fought against the Ukrainian nationalists and UPA (Ukrainian Insurgent Army) to protect the ethnic Poles from mass murder visited upon them during Massacres of Poles in Volhynia and Eastern Galicia. They were aided, until after the war was over, by the Soviet partisans. At least 60,000 Poles lost their lives, the majority of them civilians, men, women, and children. Some of the victims were Poles of Jewish descent who had escaped from the ghetto or death camp. The majority of the Polish partisans in Ukraine assisted the invading Soviet Army. Few of them got mistreated or killed by the Soviets or the Polish communists.

In Lithuania and Belarus, after a period of initial cooperation, the Poles defended themselves against the Soviet partisans as well as fought against the Lithuanian Nazi collaborators. The Poles failed to defeat the Soviet Partisans, but did achieve a decisive victory against the Lithuanian Nazi collaborators, Battle of Murowana Oszmianka. Afterward, about half of the Polish partisans in Lithuania assisted the invading Soviet Army, and many ended up mistreated and even killed by the Soviets and the Polish communists.

Ukrainian

The Ukrainian Insurgent Army (Ukrayins’ka Povstans’ka Armiya; UPA) was a Ukrainian nationalist paramilitary and later partisan army that engaged in a series of guerrilla conflicts during World War II against Nazi Germany, the Soviet Union, Czechoslovakia, and both Underground and Communist Poland. The group was the military wing of the Organization of Ukrainian Nationalists—Bandera faction (the OUN-B), originally formed in Volyn in the spring and summer of 1943. Its official date of creation is 14 October 1942, day of Intercession of the Theotokos feast.

The OUN's stated immediate goal was the re-establishment of a united, independent national state on Ukrainian ethnic territory. Violence was accepted as a political tool against foreign as well as domestic enemies of their cause, which was to be achieved by a national revolution led by a dictatorship that would drive out the occupying powers and set up a government representing all regions and social groups. The organization began as a resistance group and developed into a guerrilla army.

During its existence, the Ukrainian Insurgent Army fought against the Poles and the Soviets as their primary opponents, although the organization also fought against the Germans starting from February 1943. From late spring 1944, the UPA and Organization of Ukrainian Nationalists-B (OUN-B)—faced with Soviet advances—also cooperated in limited instances with German forces and Soviet forces against the invading Germans, Soviets, and Poles in the hope of creating an independent Ukrainian state. In response to the ethnic cleansing of Ukrainian civilians by Polish nationalists, the UPA likewise committed ethnic cleansing of the Polish population of Volhynia and East Galicia.

Soviet

Soviet partisans during World War II, especially those active in Belarus, effectively harassed German troops and significantly hampered their operations in the region. As a result, Soviet authority was re-established deep inside the German-held territories. In some areas partisan collective farms raised crops and livestock to produce food. However this was not usually the case and partisans also requisitioned supplies from the local populace, sometimes involuntarily.

Soviet partisans in Finland were known to have attacked villages and indiscriminately targeted the populace, killing entire families. The war crimes committed in Finland by Soviet partisans were investigated by the National Bureau since 1999. However, Russia refused access to Soviet archives and the investigation ended in 2003. Partisan warfare was routinely distorted in the Soviet Union. According to historian Veikko Erkkilä the Russian attitude towards civilian atrocities has been marred by the Great Patriotic War propaganda. In East Karelia, most partisans attacked Finnish military supply and communication targets, but inside Finland proper, almost two-thirds of the attacks targeted civilians, killing 200 and injuring 50, mostly women, children and elderly.

Yugoslav

The Yugoslav Partisans or the National Liberation Army (officially the National Liberation Army and Partisan Detachments of Yugoslavia), was Europe's most effective anti-Nazi resistance movement. It was led by the Communist Party of Yugoslavia during World War II. Its commander was Marshal Josip Broz Tito. They were a leading force in the liberation of their country during the People's Liberation War of Yugoslavia.

By late 1944, the total forces of the Partisans numbered 650,000 men and women organized in four field armies and 52 divisions, which engaged in conventional warfare. By April 1945, the Partisans numbered over 800,000.

Shortly before the end of the war, in March 1945, all resistance forces were reorganized into the regular armed force of Yugoslavia and renamed Yugoslav Army. It would keep this name until 1951, when it was renamed Yugoslav People's Army.

Postwar Yugoslavia was one of only two European countries that were largely liberated by its own forces during World War II.  It received significant assistance from the Soviet Union during the liberation of Serbia, and substantial assistance from the Balkan Air Force from mid-1944, but only limited assistance, mainly from the British, prior to 1944. At the end of the war no foreign troops were stationed on its soil. Partly as a result, the country found itself halfway between the two camps at the onset of the Cold War.

Lithuania

Among the three Baltic countries, the resistance was best organized in Lithuania, where guerrilla units controlled whole regions of the countryside until 1949. Their armaments included Czech Skoda guns, Russian Maxim heavy machine guns, assorted mortars and a wide variety of mainly German and Soviet light machine guns and submachine guns. When not in direct battles with the Red Army or special NKVD units, they significantly delayed the consolidation of Soviet rule through ambush, sabotage, assassination of local Communist activists and officials, freeing imprisoned guerrillas, and printing underground newspapers.

On 1 July 1944, Lithuanian Freedom Army (Lithuanian: Lietuvos laisvės armija, LLA) declared the state of war against Soviet Union and ordered all its able members to mobilize into platoons, stationed in forests and do not leave Lithuania. The departments were replaced by two sectors – operational, called Vanagai (Hawks or Falcons; abbreviated VS), and organizational (abbreviated OS). Vanagai, commanded by Albinas Karalius (codename Varenis), were the armed fighters while the organizational sector was tasked with passive resistance, including supply of food, information, and transport to Vanagai. In the middle of 1944, Lithuanian Freedom Army had 10,000 members. The Soviets killed 659 and arrested 753 members of the Lithuanian Freedom Army by 26 January 1945. Founder Kazys Veverskis was killed in December 1944, the headquarters were liquidated in December 1945. This represented the failure of highly centralized resistance, as the organization was too dependent on Veverskis and other top commanders. In 1946 remaining leaders and fighters of LLA started to merge with Lithuanian partisans. In 1949 all members of presidium of Union of Lithuanian Freedom Fighters - captain Jonas Žemaitis-Tylius, Petras Bartkus-Žadgaila, Bronius Liesys-Naktis ir Juozas Šibaila-Merainis came from LLA.

Supreme Committee for the Liberation of Lithuania (Lithuanian: Vyriausiasis Lietuvos išlaisvinimo komitetas, VLIK), was created on 25 November 1943. VLIK published underground newspapers and agitated for resistance against Nazis. Gestapo arrested most influential members in 1944. After the reoccupation of Lithuania by the Soviets, VLIK moved to the West set its goal to maintain non-recognition of Lithuania's occupation and dissemination of information from behind the iron curtain – including the information provided by the Lithuanian partisans.

Former members of Lithuanian Territorial Defense Force, Lithuanian Freedom Army, Lithuanian Armed Forces, Lithuanian Riflemen's Union formed the basis of Lithuanian partisans. Farmers, Lithuanian officials, students, teachers, even the pupils joined the partisan movement. The movement was actively supported by the society and the Catholic church. It is estimated that by the end of 1945, 30,000 armed people stayed in forests in Lithuania.

The partisans were well-armed. During the 1945-1951 Soviet repressive structures seized from partisans 31 mortars, 2,921 machine guns, 6,304 assault rifles, 22,962 rifles, 8,155 pistols, 15,264 grenades, 2,596 mines, and 3,779,133 cartridges. The partisans usually replenished their arsenal by killing istrebiteli, members of Soviet secret-police forces or by purchasing ammunition from Red Army soldiers. Every partisan had binoculars and few grenades. One grenade was usually saved to blow themselves and their faces to avoid being taken as prisoner, since the physical tortures of Soviet MGB/NKVD were very brutal and cruel, and be recognised, to prevent their relatives from suffering.

Captured Lithuanian Forest Brothers themselves often faced torture and summary execution while their relatives faced deportation to Siberia (cf. quotation). Reprisals against anti-Soviet farms and villages were harsh. The NKVD units, named People's Defense Platoons (known by the Lithuanians as pl. stribai, from the  – destroyers, i.e., the destruction battalions), used shock tactics such as displaying executed partisans' corpses in village courtyards to discourage further resistance.

The report of a commission formed at a KGB prison a few days after the 15 October 1956, arrest of Adolfas Ramanauskas ("Vanagas"), chief commander of the Union of Lithuanian Freedom Fighters, noted the following:

Juozas Lukša was among those who managed to escape to the West; he wrote his memoirs in Paris - Fighters for Freedom. Lithuanian Partisans Versus the U.S.S.R. and was killed after returning to Lithuania in 1951.

Pranas Končius (code name Adomas) was the last Lithuanian anti-Soviet resistance fighter, killed in action by Soviet forces on 6 July 1965 (some sources indicate he shot himself in order to avoid capture on 13 July). He was awarded the Cross of Vytis posthumously in 2000.

Benediktas Mikulis, one of the last known partisans to remain in the forest, emerged in 1971. He was arrested in the 1980s and spent several years in prison.

Notable partisan groups and battles

 Albanian Partisans
 Kurdish Partisans
 Armenian irregular units
 Armia Krajowa
 Armia Ludowa
 Afghan Mujahideen
 Bataliony Chłopskie
 Bushwhackers
 Bulgarian resistance movement during World War II
 Caucasian Front (Chechen War)
 Tibetan Defenders of the Faith Volunteer Army
 Cursed soldiers
 Czechoslovak resistance
 Danish resistance movement
 Dutch Resistance
 Revolutionary Armed Forces of Colombia (FARC)
 Forest Brothers
 Francs-Tireurs et Partisans
 Free French
 French Resistance
 Greek Resistance
 Green Guard
 Italian resistance movement
 Irish Republican Brotherhood
 Jewish partisans
 Jewish Combat Organization
 Kuperjanov Infantry Battalion
 Kuva-yi Milliye
 Lithuanian partisans
 Mosby's Rangers
 National Armed Forces
 Norwegian resistance movement
 Operation Anthropoid
 Partisan Ranger Act
 Peace Companies
 Pomeranian Griffin
 Polish resistance movement in World War II
 Romanian anti-communist resistance movement
 Slovak National Uprising
 Soviet partisans
 Spanish Maquis
 Ukrainian Insurgent Army
 Ukrainian resistance during the 2022 Russian invasion of Ukraine
 Viet Cong
 Yugoslav Partisans

See also
 Fifth column
 Asymmetric warfare
 Guerilla warfare
 Improvised explosive device
 Unconventional warfare

References

External links

Irregular military